Susan Holloway Scott is an American author of historical fiction who also writes under several pen names. She has also written historical romance novels under the pen names Miranda Jarrett and Isabella Bradford.

Biography
Susan Holloway Scott was born in Washington, D.C. and grew up in northern New Jersey.  Scott attended art school before enrolling at Brown University, where she earned a B.A. in art history.  After finishing school, Scott worked in university relations for Brown University, the University of Pennsylvania, and Bryn Mawr College.

Scott's first book, a historical romance called Steal the Stars, was published in 1992 by Harlequin Books under the pen name Miranda Jarrett. Since then, Scott has written over fifty historical novels and novellas under several names, and has been published by Harlequin Books, Pocket Books, Penguin Books, Ballantine Books, St Martin's Press, and Kensington Books.  Her books have been published in eleven languages in sixteen foreign countries, with over three and half million copies in print.

Scott has served on the executive board of the Romance Writers of America.  She lives with her family near Philadelphia, Pennsylvania.

Bibliography

Writing as Susan Holloway Scott

Published by Kensington Books 
 I, Eliza Hamilton (2017)

Published by Penguin Books 
 Duchess: A Novel of Sarah Churchill (2006)
 Royal Harlot: A Novel of the Countess of Castlemaine & King Charles II (2007)
 The King's Favorite: A Novel of Nell Gwyn & King Charles II (2008)
 The French Mistress: A Novel of the Duchess of Portsmouth & King Charles II (2009)
 The Countess and the King: A Novel of the Countess of Dorchester & King James II (2010)

Writing as Miranda Jarrett
Published by Harlequin Books:
 Steal the Stars (1992)
 Columbine (1992)
 Spindrift (1993)
 Providence (1993)
 Mariah's Prize (1994)
 Desire My Love (1994)
 Sparhawk's Lady (1995)
 The Sparhawk Bride (1995)
 Sparhawk's Angel (1996)
 Gift of the Heart (1996)
 The Secrets of Catie Hazard (1997)
 The Golden Lord (2003)
 The Silver Lord (2003)
 Princess of Fortune (2004)
 The Rake's Wager (2005)
 The Lady's Hazard (2005)
 The Duke's Gamble (2006)
 The Adventurous Bride (2006)
 Seduction Of An English Beauty (2007)

Novella Anthologies 
 Christmas Rogues (1995) (with Anita Mills and Patricia Potter)
 Reckless Hearts (2001) (with Heather Graham)
 Gifts of the Season (2002) (with Anne Gracie and Lyn Stone)
 April Moon (2004) (with Susan King and Merline Lovelace)
 The Betrothal (2005) (with Terri Brisbin and Joanne Rock)

Published by Pocket Books 
 The Captain's Bride (1997)
 Cranberry Point (1998)
 Wishing (1999)
 Moonlight (1999)
 Sunrise (2000)
 Starlight (2000)
 Star Bright (2000)
 The Very Daring Duchess (2001)
 The Very Comely Countess (2001)

Novella Anthology 
 Under the Boardwalk (1999) (with Linda Howard, Jillian Hunter, Geralyn Dawson, Mariah Stewart)

Writing as Isabella Bradford

Published by 
 When You Wish Upon a Duke (2012)
 When the Duchess Said Yes (2012)
 When the Duke Found Love (2012)
 A Wicked Pursuit (2014)
 A Sinful Deception (2015)
 A Reckless Desire (2016)

Sources

External links
 Susan Holloway Scott Official Website
 Susan Holloway Scott Author Blog
 Two Nerdy History Girls Blog
 Susan Holloway Scott Facebook page
 Susan Holloway Scott Instagram page
 Two Nerdy History Girls on Twitter

Living people
Brown University alumni
American historical novelists
Novelists from Pennsylvania
Year of birth missing (living people)
American women novelists
Women historical novelists
American romantic fiction novelists
Women romantic fiction writers
Writers of historical romances
Writers from Washington, D.C.
Novelists from New Jersey
20th-century American novelists
20th-century American women writers
21st-century American novelists
21st-century American women writers
20th-century pseudonymous writers
Pseudonymous women writers